Stonewall or Stone wall may refer to:

 Stone wall,  a kind of masonry construction
 Stonewalling, engaging in uncooperative or delaying tactics
 Stonewall riots, a 1969 turning point for the modern LGBTQ rights movement in Greenwich Village, New York City

Places
 Stone Wall (Australia), an escarpment overlooking the Murchison River Gorge
 Stonewall, Manitoba, Canada

United States
 Stonewall, California, an 1870s mining camp in the Cuyamaca Mountains
 Stonewall, Georgia
 Stonewall, Louisiana
 Stonewall, Mississippi
 Stonewall, North Carolina
 Stonewall, Oklahoma
 Stonewall County, Texas
 Stonewall, Texas, in Gillespie County
 Stonewall, West Virginia

Arts and entertainment
 Stonewall, a 1993 account of the Stonewall riots by Martin Duberman
 Stonewall (1995 film), about the riots
 Stonewall (2015 film), about the riots
 Stonewall (comics), a character in the Marvel universe
 Stonewall (opera), an opera commissioned by New York City Opera
 Stonewall Book Award, a set of three literary awards
 The Stonewall Chorale, an LGBT choir based in New York City, founded in 1979
 The Stonewall Operas, four mini-operas commissioned by New York University

Games
 Stonewall (solitaire)
 Stonewall Attack, a chess opening
 Stonewall Variation, in the Dutch Defence chess opening

Events 
 Stonewall 50 – WorldPride NYC 2019, events marking the fiftieth anniversary of the riots

Military
 CSS Stonewall, a French-built warship built for the Confederate States Navy
 Operation Stonewall, a World War II military operation
 Stonewall Brigade, an American Civil War Confederate unit
 USS Stonewall Jackson (SSBN-634), a ballistic missile submarine

Organizations and landmarks

Australia
 Stonewall Resources, an Australian mining company

United Kingdom
 Stonewall (charity), the largest British LGBT rights organisation, formed in 1989
 Stonewall F.C., a British gay football team

United States
 Stonewall (Rocky Mount, North Carolina), a NRHP-listed plantation house
 Stonewall Democrats, a United States Democratic Party caucus
 Stonewall Young Democrats, an affiliated youth-based organization
 Stonewall Inn, site of the 1969 Stonewall riots in Greenwich Village, Manhattan, New York City
 Stonewall National Monument, a park and landmark adjacent to the inn
 Stonewall Jackson Hotel, a hotel in Staunton, Virginia named after General Thomas "Stonewall" Jackson
 Stonewall of Miami Beach, a mixed disco that hosted the 1974 Wild Side Story
 Stonewall National Museum and Archives, an LGBT museum and library in Fort Lauderdale, Florida not directly related to the inn or the riots

People
 Erling Stonewall (died 1207), a 13th-century Norwegian pretender to the throne
 Stonewall Jackson (1824–1863), American Civil War Confederate general, Professor of Physics, Virginia Military Institute
 Stonewall Jackson (musician) (born 1932), country musician

See also
 Stonewall Uprising (2010), a documentary film
 Before Stonewall, a 1984 documentary film
 After Stonewall, a 1999 documentary film
 Montreal's Stonewall, a 1990 police raid on Sex Garage
 Dry stone, a method of building without mortar